This is a list of albums attributed to the Japanese anime and arcade series Aikatsu!.

Theme Song Singles

Signalize! / Calendar Girl
  is the theme song single of TV Anime Aikatsu!. It is released on November 21, 2012. The singers are Waka, Fūri, Sunao, and Risuko from Star☆Anis. The theme songs are used from Episode 1 until Episode 25 of the 1st Season.

Track listing
"Signalize!"
Lyrics: Aki Hata
Composition: Narasaki
Arrangement: Sadesper Record

Lyrics: Saori Kodama
Composition/Arrangement: Hidekazu Tanaka (Monaca)
"Signalize!" (Off Vocal)
 (Off Vocal)

Diamond Happy / Hirari/Hitori/Kirari
  is the single for the anime's theme songs that were featured in the second half of the anime adaption's first season. This single contains 4 tracks with singers including Waka, Fūri, Sunao, Remi, Moe, Eri, Yuna, and Risuko from Star☆Anis and released on June 26, 2013 along with the mini album "Fourth Party!". The single also has ranked 19 on Oricon's weekly chart.

Track listing

Lyrics: Aki Hata
Composition/Arrangement: Kakeru Ishihama (Monaca)

Lyrics: Natsumi Tadano
Composition/Arrangement: Keiko Hoashi (Monaca)
 (Off Vocal)
 (Off Vocal)

Kira☆Power / Original Star☆彡
  is the theme song single for the second season of TV Anime Aikatsu!. The single contains 4 tracks with singers including Waka, Fūri, Sunao, Risuko, Remi, Moe, Eri and Yuna from STAR☆ANIS. It is released on October 23, 2013, a launching event also has been held on October 27, 2013 at Tōkyō LaQua. The CD also achieved 10th ranking on Oricon's weekly chart.

Track listing
"Kira☆Power"
Lyrics: Aki Hata
Composition/Arrangement: Kakeru Ishihama (Monaca)

Lyrics: Saori Kodama
Composition/Arrangement: Hidekazu Tanaka (Monaca)
"Kira☆Power" (Off Vocal)
 (Off Vocal)

Shining Line* / Precious
  is the new theme song single for the second season of TV Anime Aikatsu!. The single contains 4 tracks with singers including Waka, Fūri, Risuko, Yuna and Mona from STAR☆ANIS. It was released on April 30, 2014.

Track listing
"Shining Line*"
Lyrics: Saori Kodama
Composition/Arrangement: Kakeru Ishihama (Monaca)
"Precious"
Lyrics: Junsara Tsuji
Composition/Arrangement: Keigo Hoashi (Monaca)
"Shining Line*" (Off Vocal)
"Precious" (Off Vocal)

Du-Du-Wa Do It!! / Good morning my dream
  is the new theme song single for the third season of TV Anime Aikatsu!. The single contains 6 tracks with singers including Waka from STAR☆ANIS and Ruka, Mona and Miki from AIKATSU☆STARS!. It is set to be released on October 22, 2014.

Track listing
"Du-Du-Wa Do It!!"
Lyrics: Saori Codama
Composition/Arrangement: Kengo Minamida
"Good morning my dream"
Lyrics: Saori Codama
Composition/Arrangement: Hidekazu Tanaka (Monaca)

Lyrics: Junko Tsuji
Composition/Arrangement: Hidekazu Tanaka (Monaca)
"Du-Du-Wa Do It!!" (Off Vocal)
"Good morning my dream" (Off Vocal)
 (Off Vocal)

Lovely Party Collection / Tutu Ballerina
  is the new theme song single for the third season of TV Anime Aikatsu!. The single contains 4 tracks with singers including Ruka, Mona and Miki from AIKATSU☆STARS!. It is set to be released on April 29, 2015.

Track listing
"Lovely Party Collection"
Lyrics: Saori Codama
Composition/Arrangement: Kakeru Ishihama (Monaca)

Lyrics: Natsumi Tadano
Composition/Arrangement: Masaaki Ishihara/Yusuke Naruse
"Lovely Party Collection" (Off Vocal)
 (Off Vocal)

Start Dash Sensation / lucky train!
  is the new theme song single for the fourth season of TV Anime Aikatsu!. The single contains 4 tracks with singers including Ruka, Mona and Miki from AIKATSU☆STARS!. It is set to be released on October 28, 2015.

Track listing
"Start Dash Sensation"
Lyrics: Saori Codama
Composition/Arrangement: Kakeru Ishihama (Monaca)
"lucky train!"
Lyrics: Natsumi Tadano
Composition: Ryota Nakano [中野領太]
Arrangement: Integral Clover (agehasprings)
"Start Dash Sensation" (Off Vocal)
"lucky train!" (Off Vocal)

Concept/Insert Song Singles

First Live!
  is the first single from audition songs released on December 26, 2012. The singers are Waka, Fūri, Sunao, Risuko, and Remi from Star☆Anis.

Track listing

Lyrics: uRy
Composition/Arrangement: Hidekazu Tanaka (Monaca)
"Move on Now!"
Lyrics: Saori Kodama
Composition/Arrangement: Hidekazu Tanaka (Monaca)
"Angel Snow"
Lyrics: Saori Kodama
Composition/Arrangement: Hidekazu Tanaka (Monaca)
 (Off Vocal)
"Move on Now!" (Off Vocal)
"Angel Snow" (Off Vocal)

Second Show!
  is the second single from audition songs released on January 31, 2013. The singers are Waka, Fūri, and Sunao from Star☆Anis.

Track listing
"Growing for a dream"
Lyrics: Yoshifumi Kochi
Composition: Hiroshi Imai
Arrangement: Masazumi Ozawa
"prism spiral"
Lyrics: uRy
Composition/Arrangement: Hidekazu Tanaka (Monaca)
"Trap of Love"
Lyrics: Nana （Make Flow, Inc.）
Composition: Kenichi Mori
Arrangement: Masazumi Ozawa
"Growing for a dream" (Off Vocal)
"prism spiral" (Off Vocal)
"Trap of Love" (Off Vocal)

Third Action!
  is the third single from audition songs released on February 27, 2013. The singers are Sunao, Risuko, and Moe from Star☆Anis.

Track listing

Lyrics: uRy
Composition/Arrangement: Hidekazu Tanaka (Monaca)
"Thrilling Dream"
Lyrics: Saori Kodama
Composition/Arrangement: Kakeru Ishihama (Monaca)

Lyrics: Saori Kodama
Composition/Arrangement: Keiko Hoashi (Monaca)
 (Off Vocal)
"Thrilling Dream" (Off Vocal)
 (Off Vocal)

Hi・Ka・Ri Shining♪
  is Hikari Minowa's debut CD prior to her debut as an official supporter of Aikatsu! Official Shop. The single contains 9 tracks with singers including Yuniko and Sunao from STAR☆ANIS. The CD was released on December 14, 2013.

Track listing
【ShortSize】 
Lyrics: uRy
Composition/Arrangement: Hidekazu Tanaka (Monaca)
【ShortSize】 
Lyrics: Aki Hata
Composition/Arrangement: Kakeru Ishihama (Monaca)
【ShortSize】 
Lyrics: Nana （Make Flow, Inc.）
Composition: Kenichi Mori
Arrangement: Masazumi Ozawa
【ShortSize】 
Lyrics: Saori Kodama
Composition/Arrangement: Hidekazu Tanaka (Monaca)
 【ShortSize】
 Off Vocal 【ShortSize】
"Kira☆Power" Off Vocal 【ShortSize】
"Trap of Love" Off Vocal 【ShortSize】
 OFF VOCAL 【ShortSize】

Cool Mode
  is the second CD release of the 2014 Series. The single contains 6 tracks with singers including Waka, Fūri, Sunao and Yuna from STAR☆ANIS. The single was released on December 21, 2013.

Track listing

Lyrics: uRy
Composition/Arrangement: Hidekazu Tanaka (Monaca)

Lyrics: Aki Hata
Composition/Arrangement: Hidekazu Tanaka (Monaca)
"We wish you a merry Christmas Aikatsu Ver."
Lyrics: Saori Kodama
Composition/Arrangement: Kei'ichi Okabe (Monaca)
 (Off Vocal)
 (Off Vocal)
"We wish you a merry Christmas Aikatsu Ver." (Off Vocal)

Sexy Style
  is the third CD release of the 2014 Series. The single contains 6 tracks with singers including Waka, Sunao, Remi and Yuna from STAR☆ANIS. The single will be released on February 26, 2014.

Track listing
"Kira・pata・shining"
Lyrics: Natsumi Tadano
Composition/Arrangement: PandaBoy

Lyrics: Saori Kodama
Composition/Arrangement: Kuniyuki Takahashi (Monaca)
"Dance in the rain"
Lyrics: uRy
Composition/Arrangement: Hidekazu Tanaka (Monaca)

Beautiful Song
  is the first CD release of the 2015 Series. The single contains 6 tracks with singers including Ruka, Mona, Miki and Miho from AIKATSU☆STARS!. The single will be released on February 25, 2015.

Track listing

Lyrics: Natsumi Tadano
Composition/Arrangement: NARASAKI
"Passion flower"
Lyrics: Hitomi Otsuka
Composition/Arrangement: Ryota Nakano/Kouichiro Takahashi

Lyrics: SINBYI
Composition/Arrangement: Kazuhiro Higure/Kengo Minamida
 (off vocal)
"Passion flower" (off vocal)
 (off vocal)

Albums

Fourth Party!
  is the first mini album of the series Aikatsu!. This album contains 8 tracks performed by Waka, Fūri, Sunao, Remi, Moe, Eri, Yuna, and Risuko from Star☆Anis, Risa, and Eimi and released on June 26, 2013 along with "Diamond Happy / Hirari/Hitori/Kirari" Single.

Track listing
"fashion check!"
Lyrics: uRy
Composition/Arrangement: Kakeru Ishihama (Monaca)
"Take Me Higher"
Lyrics: Natsumi Tadano
Composition/Arrangement: Takao Nagatani

Lyrics: Saori Kodama
Composition/Arrangement: Hidekazu Tanaka (Monaca)

Lyrics: uRy
Composition/Arrangement: Keigo Hoashi (Monaca)

Lyrics: Saori Kodama
Composition/Arrangement: Ryuichi Takada (Monaca)

Lyrics: Saori Kodama
Composition/Arrangement: Ryuichi Takada (MONACA)
"Wake up my music"
Lyrics: Saori Kodama
Composition/Arrangement: Kei'ichi Okabe (Monaca)
"Moonlight destiny"
Lyrics: Saori Kodama
Composition/Arrangement: Keigo Hoashi (Monaca)

Calendar Girls
  is the first best album of the Aikatsu! series, the album released on April 9, 2014 and will contain the songs that are yet to be contained on the released CDs. The album also reached 2nd position on Oricon's daily chart on its release day.

Track listing
▼ disc - 1
"Signalize!"
Lyrics: Aki Hata
Composition: Narasaki
Arrangement: Sadesper Record

Lyrics: Saori Kodama
Composition/Arrangement: Hidekazu Tanaka (Monaca)

Lyrics: uRy
Composition/Arrangement: Hidekazu Tanaka (Monaca)
"Growing for a dream"
Lyrics: Yoshifumi Kochi
Composition: Hiroshi Imai
Arrangement: Masazumi Ozawa
"prism spiral"
Lyrics: uRy
Composition/Arrangement: Hidekazu Tanaka (Monaca)

Lyrics: Nana （Make Flow, Inc.）
Composition: Kenichi Mori
Arrangement: Masazumi Ozawa

Lyrics: Saori Kodama
Composition/Arrangement: Hidekazu Tanaka (Monaca)

Lyrics: Saori Kodama
Composition/Arrangement: Ryuichi Takada (Monaca)

Lyrics: Saori Kodama
Composition/Arrangement: Keigo Hoashi (Monaca)
"Take Me Higher"
Lyrics: Natsumi Tadano
Composition/Arrangement: Takao Nagatani

Lyrics: Natsumi Tadano
Composition/Arrangement: Keigo Hoashi (Monaca)

Lyrics: Kenta Harada
Composition: Takayuki Sakamoto
Arrangement: Rey

▼ disc - 2

Lyrics: Aki Hata
Composition/Arrangement: Kakeru Ishihama (Monaca)

Lyrics: uRy
Composition/Arrangement: Hidekazu Tanaka (Monaca)
"Thrilling Dream"
Lyrics: Saori Kodama
Composition/Arrangement: Kakeru Ishihama (Monaca)

Lyrics: uRy
Composition/Arrangement: Keigo Hoashi (Monaca)

Lyrics: Saori Kodama
Composition/Arrangement: Ryuichi Takada (Monaca)
"Angel Snow"
Lyrics: Saori Kodama
Composition/Arrangement: Hidekazu Tanaka (Monaca)
"fashion check!"
Lyrics: uRy
Composition/Arrangement: Kakeru Ishihama (Monaca)

Lyrics: Saori Kodama
Composition/Arrangement: Kei'ichi Okabe (Monaca)
"Moonlight destiny"
Lyrics: Saori Kodama
Composition/Arrangement: Keigo Hoashi (Monaca)

Lyrics: uRy
Composition/Arrangement: Hidekazu Tanaka (Monaca)

Lyrics: Saori Kodama
Composition/Arrangement: Hidekazu Tanaka (Monaca)

Pop Assort
  is the second mini album of the series Aikatsu!. This album contains 8 tracks performed by Waka, Fūri, Remi, Eri, Risuko, Mona, and Ruka from Star☆Anis, and released on June 25, 2014. This is the first CD release to have songs performed by new Star☆Anis members Ruka and Mona.

Track listing

Lyrics: Natsumi Tadano
Composition/Arrangement: Takao Nagatani
"CHU-CHU♥RAINBOW"
Lyrics: Saori Kodama
Composition/Arrangement: Kei'ichi Hirokawa (Monaca)
"Sweet Sp!ce"
Lyrics: Tsuji Junsara
Composition/Arrangement: oriori

Lyrics: tom.m
Composition: Kengo Minamida
Arrangement: Integral Clover

Lyrics: Aki Hata
Composition/Arrangement: Keigo Hoashi (Monaca)

Lyrics: Natsumi Tadano
Composition/Arrangement: Keigo Hoashi (Monaca)

Lyrics: uRy
Composition/Arrangement: Hidekazu Tanaka (Monaca)

Lyrics: Ayako Nakanomori, Kikomaru
Composition: Ayako Nakanomori
Arrangement: Ayako Nakanomori, uuiuui (Foster Sound)

Cute Look
  is the third mini album of the series Aikatsu!. This album contains 8 tracks performed by Waka, Fūri, Remi, Eri, Yuna, Risuko, and Mona from Star☆Anis, and released on September 24, 2014.

Track listing

Lyrics: Tsuji Junsara
Composition/Arrangement: Sho Ishihama (Monaca)

Lyrics: Natsumi Hayashi
Composition/Arrangement: Yuusuke Naruse
"stranger alien"
Lyrics: Natsumi Tadano
Composition/Arrangement: Keiichi Okabe (Monaca)

Lyrics: Saori Kodama
Composition/Arrangement: Takao Nagatani

Lyrics: Reika Kanda
Composition/Arrangement: Shogo Onishi

Lyrics: Natsumi Watanabe
Composition/Arrangement: Masashi Hamauzu

Lyrics: Mami Yamada
Composition: Keisuke Yamazaki
Arrangement: Kengo Minamida

Lyrics: Aki Hata
Composition/Arrangement: Sho Ishihama (Monaca)

Shining Star
  is the second best album of the Aikatsu! series, the album released on February 11, 2015. The album also reached 2nd position on Oricon's daily chart on its release day.

Track listing
▼ disc - 1
"Kira☆Power"
Lyrics: Aki Hata
Composition/Arrangement: Kakeru Ishihama (Monaca)

Lyrics: uRy
Composition/Arrangement: Hidekazu Tanaka (Monaca)

Lyrics: Saori Codama
Composition/Arrangement: Kuniyuki Takahashi (Monaca)

Lyrics: Saori Codama
Composition/Arrangement: Takao Nagatani

Lyrics: Aki Hata
Composition/Arrangement: Keigo Hoashi (Monaca)

Lyrics: Natsumi Hayashi
Composition/Arrangement: Yusuke Naruse

Lyrics: Natsumi Tadano
Composition/Arrangement: Takao Nagatani

Lyrics: tom.m
Composition/Arrangement: Kengo Minamida/Integral Clover
"stranger alien"
Lyrics: Natsumi Tadano
Composition/Arrangement: Keiichi Okabe (Monaca)
"Dance in the rain"
Lyrics: uRy
Composition/Arrangement: Hidekazu Tanaka (Monaca)

Lyrics: Saori Codama
Composition/Arrangement: Hidekazu Tanaka (Monaca)

▼ disc - 2

Lyrics: Junko Tsuji
Composition/Arrangement: Kakeru Ishihama (Monaca)
"Sweet Sp!ce"
Lyrics: Junko Tsuji
Composition/Arrangement: oriori

Lyrics: Natsumi Tadano
Composition/Arrangement: PandaBoY

Lyrics: Natsumi Tadano
Composition/Arrangement: Keigo Hoashi (Monaca)

Lyrics: Aki Hata
Composition/Arrangement: Hidekazu Tanaka (Monaca)
"CHU-CHU♡RAINBOW"
Lyrics: Saori Codama
Composition/Arrangement: Keiichi Hirokawa (Monaca)

Lyrics: Natsumi Watanabe
Composition/Arrangement: Masashi Hamauzu

Lyrics: Leo Kanda
Composition/Arrangement: Shogo Ohnishi

Lyrics: uRy
Composition/Arrangement: Hidekazu Tanaka (Monaca)

Lyrics: Junko Tsuji
Composition/Arrangement: Keigo Hoashi (Monaca)

Lyrics: Mami Yamada
Composition/Arrangement: Keisuke Yamasaki/Kengo Minamida
"Shining Line* ~All Stars Ver.~"
Lyrics: Saori Codama
Composition/Arrangement: Kakeru Ishihama (Monaca)

Joyful Dance
  is the four mini album of the series Aikatsu!. Released on June 24, 2015.

Track listing
"Pretty Pretty"
Lyrics: Natsumi Watanabe
Composition/Arrangement: connie
"Blooming♡Blooming"
Lyrics: Saori Codama
Composition/Arrangement: Keiichi Hirokawa (Monaca)
"MY SHOW TIME!"
Lyrics: Tomohiro Akiura
Composition: Tomoyoshi Suzuki
Arrangement: Integral Clover

Lyrics: tzk
Composition: Keisuke Yamasaki
Arrangement: Yusuke Naruse

Lyrics: Junko Tsuji
Composition/Arrangement: Kakeru Ishihama (Monaca)
"Poppin' Bubbles"
Lyrics: AM42
Composition/Arrangement: mito

Lyrics: Ayumi Tamura
Composition/Arrangement: Narasaki

Lyrics: Saori Codama
Composition/Arrangement: Keigo Hoashi (Monaca)
"Pretty Pretty" (off vocal)
"Blooming♡Blooming" (off vocal)
"MY SHOW TIME!" (off vocal)
 (off vocal)
 (off vocal)
"Poppin' Bubbles" (off vocal)
 (off vocal)
 (off vocal)

Colorful Smile
  is the fifth mini album of the series Aikatsu!. Released on August 26, 2015.

Track listing
"Hey! little girl"
Lyrics: Ayako Nakanomori, KIKOMARU
Composition/Arrangement: Ayako Nakanomori
"Chica×Chica"
Lyrics: Izumi Soratani [空谷泉身]
Composition/Arrangement: Yusuke Naruse (onetrap)

Lyrics: tzk
Composition: Tomohiro Akiura [秋浦智裕]
Arrangement: Yusuke Naruse (onetrap)

Lyrics: Hiroyuki Onoda (Hifumi)
Composition/Arrangement: fu_mou (Hifumi)
"Sweet Heart Restaurant"
Lyrics: Hitomi Otsuka [大塚ひとみ]
Composition: Tomohiro Akiura
Arrangement: Hiroaki Yokoyama (agehasprings)

Lyrics: Natsumi Tadano
Composition/Arrangement: kensuke ushio

Lyrics: Saori Codama
Composition/Arrangement: Watchman
"Lovely Party Collection (Stars! ver.)"
Lyrics: Saori Codama
Composition/Arrangement: Kakeru Ishihama (Monaca)
"Hey! little girl" (off vocal)
"Chica×Chica" (off vocal)
 (off vocal)
 (off vocal)
"Sweet Heart Restaurant" (off vocal)
 (off vocal)
 (off vocal)

Wonderful Tour 

 
 Lyrics: Natsumi Tadano
Composition/Arrangement: Takao Nagatani
 
 Lyrics: Genmai
Composition/Arrangement: Shōgo Ōnishi
 
 Lyrics: Saori Codama
Composition: Narasaki
Arrangement: Watchman
 "Love Game"
 Lyrics: Sinbyi
 Composition: Ryota Nakano
 Arrangement: Shōgo Ōnishi (agehasprings)
 
 Lyrics: Saori Codama
Composition/Arrangement: Kakeru Ishihama
 
 Lyrics: tom.m
Composition: Keisuke Yamazaki
Arrangement: Yusuke Naruse (onetrap)
 
 Lyrics: Junsara Tsuji
Composition/Arrangement: Keigo Hoashi
  (Bonus Track 1)
  (off vocal)
  (off vocal)
  (off vocal)
 "LOVE GAME" (off vocal)
  (off vocal)
  (off vocal)
  (off vocal)
  (off vocal) (Bonus Track 2)

Original Soundtracks

Aikatsu! Music!! 01
  is the first Original Soundtrack of Aikatsu! TV Anime Series. The CD was released on September 25, 2013.

Track listing
"Signalize!" （TV-size）
Lyrics: Aki Hata
Composition: NARASAKI
Arrangement: SADESPER RECORD

（TV-size）
Lyrics: Aki Hata
Composition/Arrangement: Kakeru Ishihama (Monaca)

（TV-size）
Lyrics: Natsumi Tadano
Composition/Arrangement: Keigo Hoashi (Monaca)

（TV-size）
Lyrics: Saori Kodama
Composition/Arrangement: Hidekazu Tanaka (Monaca)

（TV-size）
Lyrics: Professor Mizushima
Composition/Arrangement: Kuniyuki Takahashi (Monaca)
（TV-size）
Lyrics: Kenta Harada
Composition: Takayuki Sakamoto
Arrangement: Rey

Music Composed by Monaca
Hidekazu Tanaka [Track 2, 3, 4, 5, 7, 12, 21, 22, 27, 31]
Kei'ichi Okabe [Track 6, 15, 16, 17, 19, 20, 28]
Kakeru Ishihama [Track 10, 13, 14, 18, 23, 26, 29, 30, 36]
Keigo Hoashi [Track 9, 11, 32, 34, 35, 38]
Ryuichi Takada [Track 24, 25]

Works based on Bandai Namco video games
Lists of albums
Anime soundtracks
2013 soundtrack albums
Lantis (company) soundtracks
Albums